"Los Malaventurados No Lloran" (English: Unhappy Boys Don't Cry) is a song by the Mexican rock band Panda. It was released in March 2007 as the second single from the band's fourth album, Amantes Sunt Amentes. The song reached the MTV TRL in Latin America, known as Los 10+ Pedidos, where it peaked at number one. The lyrics deal with suicide, depression and the lost of a loved one.

Charts

References

Rock en Español songs
Panda (band) songs
Songs written by José Madero
Songs about suicide